Kalasin is one of Thailand's seventy-six provinces (changwat), located in upper northeastern Thailand, also called Isan. The province was established by the Act Establishing Changwat Kalasin, BE 2490 (1947), and it came into existence on 1 October 1947.
Neighboring provinces are (from north clockwise) Sakon Nakhon, Mukdahan, Roi Et, Maha Sarakham, Khon Kaen, and Udon Thani.

Geography
Most of the province is covered by a hilly landscape. In the north is the Lam Pao Dam built from 1963 to 1968. It stores 1,430 million m3 of water for flood prevention and agriculture. The Lam Pao reservoir effectively cuts the northern part of the province in half, but there are car ferries connecting the district of Sahatsakhan in the east with the district Nong Kung Si in the west, saving up to one hour off the journey by road. On the northwestern creek of the reservoir, a road bridge connects the village of Ban Dong Bang in the west with the district town of Wang Sam Mo in the east. Although the bridge was constructed several years ago (pre-2000), it is not featured (2006) on any commercially available road maps.
Kalasin is known for the dinosaur fossils found at Phu Kum Khao (Sahatsakhan District), the largest dinosaur site in Thailand. Most of the fossils are sauropods from 120 million years ago.

The Phu Phan mountain range marks the border with Sakhon Nakhon province, part of which is preserved as a national park.

National parks
There are two national parks, along with five other national parks, make up region 10 (Udon Thani) of Thailand's protected areas. 
 Phu Phan National Park, 
 Phu Pha Lek National Park,

Wildlife sanctuary
There is one wildlife sanctuary , along with five other wildlife sanctuaries, make up region 9 (Ubon Ratchathani) of Thailand's protected areas. 
 Phu Si Than Wildlife Sanctuary,

Economy
Kalasin is an agricultural province producing sticky rice and other cash crops such as manioc (cassava) and sugar cane. Families typically live in a stress free environment simply growing fruits and vegetables to live off in this essentially rural area and make ends meet by producing baskets and the silk for which the region is renowned.

History
Archaeological excavations at Mueang Fa Daet Song Yang, a site located within the province, uncovered an inscription in the Old Mon language, which provides insights into the language and culture of the Mon people during the 8th century CE Dvaravati period This inscription is significant for shedding light on the history and development of the Old Mon language, and its role in the region’s history and culture during the Dvaravati period in Northeastern Thailand. Similar inscriptions have also been found in Maha Sarakham and Khon Kaen provinces, highlighting the broader importance of this discovery for the study of the Dvaravati period in Northeastern Thailand.

The first official town was founded in 1793. During the Thesaphiban reforms in the reign of King Rama V at the beginning of the 20th century, the town (mueang) was upgraded to a province. In 1932, when the country experienced the great economic depression, the province was demoted and absorbed as a district by Maha Sarakham province to reduce the financial burden on the country, Kalasin was dependent on Maha Sarakham for 16 years. After the great recession and World War II, it once again became a province in 1947.

Symbols
The seal of the province shows a pond in front of the Phu Phan Mountains which form the boundary of the province. The water in the pond is black, as the name Kalasin means "black water". The big clouds as well as the water symbolize the fertility of the province.

The provincial logo and landmark is the Phra That Yakhu, an octagonal-shaped chedi, made of bricks.

The provincial flower is payorm or sweet shorea (Shorea roxburghii), and the provincial tree is sa-mae-san  (Cassia garrettiana).

The provincial slogan is Fa Daet Song Yang ancient city, Pong Lang folk music, Phu Thai culture, Phrae Wa silk, Pha Saweoi Phu Phan, Lam Pao River, and million-year dinosaurs.

Administrative divisions

Provincial government

The province is divided into 18 districts (amphoes). The districts are further divided into 134 subdistricts (tambons) and 1,509 villages (mubans).

Local government
As of 26 November 2019 there are: one Kalasin  Provincial Administration Organisation and 79 municipal (thesaban) areas in the province. Kalasin and Bua Khao have town (thesaban mueang) status. Further 77 subdistrict municipalities (thesaban tambon). The non-municipal areas are administered by 71 Subdistrict Administrative Organisations - SAO (ongkan borihan suan tambon).

Human achievement index 2017

Since 2003, United Nations Development Programme (UNDP) in Thailand has tracked progress on human development at sub-national level using the Human achievement index (HAI), a composite index covering all the eight key areas of human development. National Economic and Social Development Board (NESDB) has taken over this task since 2017.

References

External links

Provincial website (Thai)
Kalasin, Tourist Authority of Thailand

 
Isan
Provinces of Thailand